Meenglas Halt railway station served Meenglas near Stranorlar in County Donegal, Ireland.

The station opened on 1 January 1891 on the West Donegal Railway line from Stranorlar to Donegal.

It closed on 1 November 1956.

Routes

References

Disused railway stations in County Donegal
Railway stations opened in 1891
Railway stations closed in 1956